Nabadiganta metro station is a station of Kolkata Metro Line 6, serving the Sector V  and Mahishbathan areas of Bidhannagar. It is located over the Biswa Bangla Sarani and at the entrance of the Newtown area.

Station

Layout

See also 
List of Kolkata Metro stations

References 
The Telegraph

Kolkata Metro stations
Railway stations in Kolkata